Annick Mito Horiuchi is a French historian of mathematics and historian of science. She is a professor at Paris Diderot University, where she is associated with the Centre de recherche sur les civilisations de l'Asie orientale (CRCAO).

Horiuchi completed a doctorate in 1990; her dissertation, Etude de seki takakazu (?-1708) et takebe katahiro (1664-1739), deux mathematiciens de l'epoque d'edo, was directed by Paul Akamatsu.
She was an invited speaker at the 1990 International Congress of Mathematicians.

Books
Horiuchi's books include:
Les mathématiques japonaises à l’époque d’Edo (1600-1868) — une étude des travaux de Seki Takakazu (?-1708) et de Takebe Katahiro (1664-1739), Mathesis 1994, translated into English as Japanese Mathematics in the Edo Period (1600–1868): A study of the works of Seki Takakazu (?–1708) and Takebe Katahiro (1664–1739), Birkhäuser 2010.
Repenser l'ordre, repenser l'héritage: Paysage intellectuel du Japon (xviie-xixe siècles), edited with Frédéric Girard and Mieko Macé, Droz 2002.
Traduire, transposer, naturaliser: La formation d’une langue scientifique moderne hors des frontières de l’Europe au XIXe siècle, edited with Pascal Crozet, l'Harmattan, 2004.
Listen, Copy, Read: Popular Learning in Early Modern Japan, edited with Matthias Hayek, Brill, 2014.

References

Year of birth missing (living people)
Living people
20th-century French historians
20th-century French mathematicians
French women mathematicians
French historians of mathematics
Academic staff of Paris Diderot University
French women historians
21st-century French historians